Tamás Linder is a Hungarian computer engineer working as a professor at the Queen's University at Kingston

Education 
Linder earned a Master of Science degree in electrical engineering from the Budapest University of Technology and Economics in 1988 and a PhD in electrical engineering from the Hungarian Academy of Sciences in 1992. He was a post-doctoral researcher at the University of Hawaiʻi at Mānoa and a Fulbright Scholar at the Coordinated Science Laboratory from 1993 to 1994.

Career 
From 1994 to 1998, Linder a member of the computer science faculty at the Budapest University of Technology and Economics. He was also a visiting research scholar in the Department of Electrical and Computer Engineering at the University of California, San Diego. Linder joined the Queen's University at Kingston in 1998. In 2003 and 2004, he was an associate editor of IEEE Transactions on Information Theory. Linder was named a fellow of the Institute of Electrical and Electronics Engineers (IEEE) in 2013 for his contributions to source coding and quantization.

References 

Fellow Members of the IEEE
Academic staff of Queen's University at Kingston
Canadian engineers
Living people
Year of birth missing (living people)
Place of birth missing (living people)
Budapest University of Technology and Economics alumni
Academic staff of the Budapest University of Technology and Economics
University of California, San Diego faculty
University of Hawaiʻi at Mānoa alumni